Mount Atlas is an extinct volcanic cone at the northeast side of Mount Pleiones in The Pleiades, Victoria Land, Antarctica. The geographical feature was so named by the New Zealand Antarctic Place-Names Committee in association with nearby Mount Pleiones after the mythological Atlas of Greek mythology. The feature lies on the Pennell Coast, a portion of Antarctica lying between Cape Williams and Cape Adare.

See also
List of volcanoes in Antarctica

References
 

Volcanoes of Victoria Land
Pennell Coast
Atlas (mythology)